Tahsin (also transliterated as Tahseen) is an Arabic word which means improve, enhance, or enrich. It is used as a given name for males and females in Arabic-speaking and Muslim countries.

Given name

Tahseen
 Tahseen Bashir (1925–2002), 
Nurul Tashin

 Tahseen Jabbary, Dutch football coach
 Tahseen Ullah Khan, Pakistani naval officer

Tahsin
 Tahsin Aykutalp (1926-2013), Turkish miniaturist and Tezhip teacher
 Tahsin Ertuğruloğlu (born 1953), Turkish Cypriot politician
 Tahsin Gemil (born 1943), Romanian historian
 Tahsin Özgüç (1916–2005), Turkish archaeologist
 Tahsin Şahinkaya (1925–2015), Turkish Air Force general
 Tahsin Yazıcı (1892–1971), Turkish army officer

Middle name
 Hasan Tahsin Mayatepek, Turkish diplomat
Hasan Tahsin Uzer, Turkish politician

Surname

Tahseen
 Qudsia Tahseen (born 1964), Indian Professor of Zoology
 Shahyan Tahseen, also transliterated as Şehyan Tehsîn, (born 1988), Kurdish anchor, television presenter and reporter

Tahsin
 Hasan Tahsin, the code name of Osman Nevres (1888–1919), an Ottoman-born Turkish nationalist, patriot, journalist, republican from a Dönmeh background and a hero of the Turkish nation
 Hasan Tahsin Pasha (1845–1918), a senior Ottoman military officer, who served in Yemen and in the First Balkan War
 Hasan Tahsin (poet) (1800/1801–1861), also known as Kör Tahsin ("Blind Tahsin"), Turkish Cypriot divan poet and Islamic jurist
 Soeraedi Tahsin (died 2003), also known as Eddie Soeraedi, Indonesian journalist and diplomat

Others
 Abu Tahsin al-Salhi; (1953–2017), Iraqi veteran sniper

See also
 Tahsini

Arabic masculine given names
Turkish masculine given names